Edward Basil Farnham (19 April 1799 – 13 May 1879) was a British Conservative politician.

Farnham was the son of Edward Farnham and Harriet, daughter of Dr. Rhudde. He married Gertrude Emily Cradock-Hartopp, daughter of Sir William Edmund Cradock-Hartopp, 3rd Baronet and Jane Mary née Keane, in 1851. They had at least one child, William Edward John Basil Farnham. Farnham lived at Quarndon House in Leicestershire.

One of the first MPs to support Benjamin Disraeli for leader of the Conservatives, Farnham was first elected Conservative MP for North Leicestershire at the 1837 general election and held the seat until 1859 when he did not stand for re-election.

Outside of politics, Farnham was a Justice of the Peace and a Deputy Lieutenant for Leicestershire, as well as, in 1870, High Sheriff of Leicestershire. He was also a major in the Leicestershire Yeomanry Cavalry.

References

External links
 

Conservative Party (UK) MPs for English constituencies
UK MPs 1837–1841
UK MPs 1841–1847
UK MPs 1847–1852
UK MPs 1852–1857
UK MPs 1857–1859
1799 births
1879 deaths
English justices of the peace
Deputy Lieutenants of Leicestershire
High Sheriffs of Leicestershire